Henrikas Radauskas (born in 1910 in Kraków, Poland, died in 1970 in Washington, D.C.) was a Lithuanian poet and writer.

Radauskas spent his childhood in Panevėžys; subsequently his family relocated to Novonikolayevsk, currently Novosibirsk, where he started attending school. After Lithuania reestablished its independence following the First World War, his family returned to Lithuania. There he studied Lithuanian, German and Russian literatures at the Vytautas Magnus University in Kaunas. In 1936 he became an editor for the Lithuanian Commission of Book Publishing. Radauskas emigrated to the United States in 1949. During his last years he worked for the Library of Congress.

He wrote four poem suites:
 "Fontanas" ("Fountain")
 "Strėlė danguje" ("Arrow in the sky")
 "Žiemos daina" ("Winter song")
 "Eilėraščiai" ("Poems")
 "Pasaka" ("Fairytale")

References
 THE APPLIED AESTHETICISM OF HENRIKAS RADAUSKAS. Lituanus, Spring 1977.

1910 births
1970 deaths
Lithuanian male poets
Vytautas Magnus University alumni
Writers from Kraków
20th-century poets
Soviet emigrants to the United States